The green jery (Neomixis viridis) is a species of bird in the family Cisticolidae.
It is endemic to Madagascar.

Its natural habitat is subtropical or tropical moist lowland forest.

References

green jery
green jery
Taxonomy articles created by Polbot
Fauna of the Madagascar subhumid forests